During the civil unrest that followed the murder of George Floyd in May 2020, a number of monuments and memorials associated with racial injustice were vandalized, destroyed or removed, or commitments to remove them were announced. This occurred mainly in the United States, but also in several other countries. Some of the monuments in question had been the subject of lengthy, years-long efforts to remove them, sometimes involving legislation and/or court proceedings. In some cases the removal was legal and official; in others, most notably in Alabama and North Carolina, laws prohibiting the removal of monuments were deliberately broken.

Initially, protesters targeted monuments related to the Confederate States of America, its leaders and its military. As the scope of the protests broadened to include other forms of systemic racism, many statues of Christopher Columbus in the United States were removed, as he participated in abuses against Native Americans and his arrival in the Americas was the beginning of the genocide of Native American people.  Statues of Junípero Serra, Juan de Oñate and Kit Carson, also involved in mistreatment of Native Americans, were also torn down or removed. Monuments to many other local figures connected with racism were also removed. Several statues of American slave owners were also vandalized or removed, including Thomas Jefferson, George Washington, Ulysses S. Grant, and Francis Scott Key. By October 2020, over a hundred Confederate symbols had been "removed, relocated or renamed", as the Huffington Post put it, based on data from the Southern Poverty Law Center.

Some monuments that are not associated with the Confederacy, slavery, or racism were also targeted. In Madison, Wisconsin, the statue of abolitionist Hans Christian Heg, was torn down and thrown into a lake. Heg had owned and published a newspaper that was anti-slavery. He had been "a leader of Wisconsin's Wide Awakes, an anti-slave catcher militia". In addition, the same mob also tore down a statue of a woman, titled Forward, by sculptor Jean Pond Miner. In Portland, a statue of an elk was burned, originally created to commemorate the many elk that used to lie in the area. The statue of York, a Black slave with the Lewis and Clark Expedition, the first Black person to travel across the continent, was removed by the University of Portland.

In the United Kingdom, removal efforts and vandalism focused on memorials to figures involved in the transatlantic slave trade, British colonialism, and eugenics. In Belgium, sculptures of King Leopold II were targeted due to his rule during the atrocities in the Congo Free State. In New Zealand, a statue of a British military officer John Hamilton was removed, and in India another colonial-era statue was relocated. In South Africa, a bust of Cecil Rhodes was decapitated, and a statue of the last president of the Orange Free State was taken down.

This list is limited to successful removals, and instances in which a person or body with authority has committed itself to removal. It does not include the many works that have been the subject of petitions, protests, defacement, or attempted removals, such as the Emancipation Memorial in Washington, D.C. and many statues of Leopold II in Belgium. It also does not include statues that fell or subject to attempted removals as a result of the Rhodes Must Fall movement that predates Floyd's murder by five years such as the statue of Cecil Rhodes at Oriel College, Oxford, England.

Sculptures and other monuments 
The following monuments and memorials were removed during the George Floyd protests, mainly due to their connections to racism. The majority are in the United States and mostly commemorate the Confederate States of America (CSA), but some monuments were also removed in other countries, for example the statues of slave traders in the United Kingdom.

Notes:
 
 
 Dates are in 2020 unless otherwise specified.

United States
The following monuments and memorials were removed during the George Floyd protests due to their association with racism in the United States. Most commemorated people involved in the Lost Cause of the Confederacy, with others linked to the genocide of Native Americans, segregation in the United States, and related issues. In a few instances, like the Montgomery County Confederate Soldiers Monument and the statue of John Mason, the monuments had already been moved from their original location, sometimes more than once, as different venues objected.

Confederate monuments

The Confederate States of America fought a four-year war (the American Civil War) to preserve the institution of slavery. After its defeat, all enslaved African Americans were freed and became citizens with the right to vote and hold office. Confederate monuments commemorate politicians, Army officers, and soldiers of the Confederacy. Most are in the former CSA states.

This table does not include Virginia, which is in a second table that follows.

{| class="wikitable sortable" style="text-align:left"
! colspan="2" | Monument/memorial
! City
! State, etc.
! Removal announced
! Removed
! Means of removal
! class="unsortable" | Notes
! class="unsortable" | 

{{RM row
| Statue of Robert E. Lee
| 
| Washington
| District of Columbia
|	
| 	
| Removed by staff from the Architect of the Capitol
| The statue, formerly one of Virginia's two contributions to the National Statuary Hall at the United States Capitol rotunda, will be moved to the Virginia Museum of History & Culture. Virginia Governor Ralph Northam filed a request for a bill to remove the statue in December 2020.
| <ref>Pitofsky, Marina (January 2, 2020). Virginia governor seeking to remove Robert E. Lee statue from US Capitol. The Hill. Retrieved April 20, 2021.</ref>
}}

Virginia

Virginia, where the CSA had its capital in Richmond, has the most Confederate monuments of any U.S. state. A March 2020 change in the law of Virginia had already essentially repealed the statute preventing removal of historical monuments, effective from July 1, 2020. This change became possible when voters, after electing the Democrat Ralph Northam as Governor in 2017, gave the Democrats control of both houses of the Virginia General Assembly from January 2020, for the first time in a generation.

{| class="wikitable sortable" style="text-align:left"
! colspan="2" | Monument/memorial
! City
! State
! Removal announced
! Removed
! Means of removal
! class="unsortable" | Notes
! class="unsortable" | 

 Genocide of indigenous peoples 

Monuments dedicated to individuals accused of involvement in the genocide of indigenous peoples in the Americas have been removed.

Juan de Oñate, when governor of Santa Fe de Nuevo México, was responsible for the 1599 Acoma Massacre. Junípero Serra, a Franciscan friar, was involved in enslaving Chumash people in the 18th century for the building and supplying of the Spanish missions in California. Diego de Vargas, also governor of Santa Fe de Nuevo México, led the reconquest of the territory in 1692, after the Pueblo Revolt of 1680.

A handful of towns in Spain have offered to receive statues of Spaniards unwanted in the U.S.

{| class="wikitable sortable" style="text-align:left"
! colspan="2" | Monument/memorial
! City
! State
! Removal announced
! Removed
! Means of removal
! class="unsortable" | Notes
! class="unsortable" | 

Christopher Columbus

Several statues of Christopher Columbus, the initiator of the European colonization of the Americas, have been removed because of his alleged enslavement of and systemic violence against the indigenous peoples of the Caribbean, including the genocide of the Taíno people.

{| class="wikitable sortable" style="text-align:left"
! colspan="2" | Monument/memorial
! City
! State
! Removal announced
! Removed
! Means of removal
! class="unsortable" | Notes
! class="unsortable" | 

Others

{| class="wikitable sortable" style="text-align:left"
! colspan="2" | Monument/memorial
! City
! State
! Removal announced
! Removed
! Means of removal
! class="unsortable" | Notes
! class="unsortable" | 

 Nazi POW Gravestones.  San Antonio, Texas. Announced June 1. Removed December 23. Removed by Fort Sam Houston National Cemetery employees. Source.

United Kingdom

Atlantic slave trade

The Royal African Company, which engaged in African slave trading between 1662 and 1731, enslaved and shipped more Africans to the Americas than any other institution in the history of the Atlantic slave trade.
{| class="wikitable sortable" style="text-align:left"
! colspan="2" | Monument/memorial
! Location
! Removal announced
! Removed
! Means of removal
! class="unsortable" | Notes
! class="unsortable" | 

Others
{| class="wikitable sortable" style="text-align:left"
! colspan="2" | Monument/memorial
! Location
! Removal announced
! Removed
! Means of removal
! class="unsortable" | Notes
! class="unsortable" | 

Belgium

King Leopold II of Belgium personally ruled the Congo Free State from 1885 to 1908, treating it as his personal property. During this period, many well-documented atrocities were perpetrated against the population, including the severing of hands of workers unable to meet a production quota for rubber, and the destruction of entire villages that were unwilling to participate in the forced labour regime.  These acts contributed to a genocide during this period, often estimated at between five million and ten million.

New Zealand

Royal Navy officer John Fane Charles Hamilton, after whom the city of Hamilton is named, played a prominent part in the Tauranga campaign of the New Zealand Wars.
{| class="wikitable sortable" style="text-align:left"
! colspan="2" | Monument/memorial
! Location
! Removal announced
! Removed
! Means of removal
! class="unsortable" | Notes
! class="unsortable" | 

South Africa
Statues that come down in South Africa were preceded by and done in the context of the Rhodes Must Fall movement that resulted in the removal of a statue of Cecil Rhodes at the University of Cape Town.
{| class="wikitable sortable" style="text-align:left"
! colspan="2" | Monument/memorial
! Location
! Removal announced
! Removed
! Means of removal
! class="unsortable" | Notes
! class="unsortable" | 

India

{| class="wikitable sortable" style="text-align:left"
! colspan="2" | Monument/memorial
! Location
! Removal announced
! Removed
! Means of removal
! class="unsortable" | Notes
! class="unsortable" | 

France
On May 22, 2020, before the murder of George Floyd, two statues of Victor Schœlcher were torn down in Martinique, an overseas department of France. Further colonial monuments in the overseas departments were targeted later in the year and in 2021; those which were mutilated in the period after May 25, 2020, are listed here.

The French president Emmanuel Macron declared his opposition to removing statues relating to France's colonial history on June 14, 2020.

{| class="wikitable sortable" style="text-align:left"
! colspan="2" | Monument/memorial
! Location
! Region
! Removal announced
! Removed
! Means of removal
! class="unsortable" | Notes
! class="unsortable" | 

Barbados
{| class="wikitable sortable" style="text-align:left"
! colspan="2" | Monument/memorial
! Location
! Removal announced
! Removed
! Means of removal
! class="unsortable" | Notes
! class="unsortable" | 
|-

Canada

In Canada, removed statues were attacked in a general anticolonialism context rather than being directly linked to the typical BLM targets in Britain or the United States.

{| class="wikitable sortable" style="text-align:left"
! colspan="2" | Monument/memorial
! Location
! Province
! Removal announced
! Removed
! Means of removal
! class="unsortable" | Notes
! class="unsortable" | 
|-

Ireland
{| class="wikitable sortable" style="text-align:left"
! colspan="2" | Monument/memorial
! Location
! Removal announced
! Removed
! Means of removal
! class="unsortable" | Notes
! class="unsortable" | 

Colombia

{| class="wikitable sortable" style="text-align:left"
! colspan="2" | Monument/memorial
! Location
! Department
! Removal announced
! Removed
! Means of removal
! class="unsortable" | Notes
! class="unsortable" | 
|-

Removals under consideration

Some officials have announced their decisions to remove monuments under their jurisdiction, and are currently working to push through whatever legislative or permission barriers they need to accomplish their goals.

 Alaska: Anchorage Mayor Ethan Berkowitz announced on June 24, 2020, that he will leave the decision about removal of the statue of James Cook in downtown Anchorage up to the Native Village of Eklutna and other area Denaʼina tribes.
 Florida: Protesters at Florida State University, Tallahassee, call for removal of the Eppes Statue, at the original entrance to the campus; he was a slaveowner who was influential in the founding of Florida State. The building of the College of Criminology and Criminal Justice is also named for him. Protesters are also calling for renaming of Doak Campbell Stadium (see under List of name changes due to the George Floyd protests#United States).
 Louisiana: East Feliciana Parish Police Jury announced June 15, 2020, that they will revisit in two weeks the issue of a possible removal of a Confederate statue that sits outside their courthouse.
 Louisiana: City of Alexandria voted to have Confederate Monument in front of Rapides Parish Courthouse. However, there is an ongoing court case to determine who owns the statue: the City of Alexandria, Rapides Parish, or the UDC.
 Kentucky: Murray City Council passed a unanimous vote to remove the Confederate Monument of Robert E. Lee from in front of their courthouse. The County Attorney isn't sure if the county has authority to move the statue, which is on the National Register of Historic Places, and so is conducting further research. Public feedback is expected.
 Mississippi: Forrest County Supervisors passed a measure on June 15, 2020. In November, voters will decide about the removal of a Confederate monument in front of their courthouse.
 Ohio: Cincinnati city council member is making a motion to remove an equestrian statue of President William Henry Harrison from Piatt Park. June 14, 2020
 Texas: Weatherford: The United Daughters of the Confederacy asked for the removal of the United Confederate Veterans of Parker County monument in front of the Parker County Courthouse.
 Virginia: Virginia Beach City Council announced on June 12, 2020, that they covered and fenced the Confederate monument sitting at the Old Princess Anne County Courthouse until after July 1, 2020, when the city will have the authority to make decisions about the monument. A public hearing will be scheduled in July 2020.
 Washington, D.C.: In July the House voted to remove 11 Confederate statues and statues of three others – Charles Aycock, John C. Calhoun, and James Paul Clarke – from the United States Capitol. The statues are part of the National Statuary Hall Collection, a set of 100, with two supplied by each state. Senate Republican leader Mitch McConnell said replacement decisions should be up to the individual states and the bill would need to pass the GOP-controlled Senate.

 Other artworks 

 United States 
{| class="wikitable sortable" style="text-align:left"
! colspan="2" | Artwork
! City
! State
! Removal announced
! Removed
! Means of removal
! class="unsortable" | Notes
! class="unsortable" | 

United Kingdom
{| class="wikitable sortable" style="text-align:left"
! colspan="2" | Artwork
! Location
! Removal announced
! Removed
! Means of removal
! class="unsortable" | Notes
! class="unsortable" | 

 France 
In metropolitan France, one of the few artworks connected to racism removed in this period is a mural paying tribute to George Floyd and Adama Traoré. The death of Adama Traoré in 2016 caused the Justice pour Adama movement against racism and police violence, which was reactivated in 2020, inspired by the Black Lives Matter movement in the United States.
{| class="wikitable sortable" style="text-align:left"
!  | Artwork
! City
! Département
! Removal announced
! Removed
! Means of removal
! class="unsortable" | Notes
! class="unsortable" | 

Plaques and signs

United States
{| class="wikitable sortable" style="text-align:left"
! Plaque
! City
! State
! Removal announced
! Removed
! Means of removal
! class="unsortable" | Notes
! class="unsortable" | 

United Kingdom
{| class="wikitable sortable" style="text-align:left"
! colspan="2" | Plaque
! Location
! Removal announced
! Removed
! Means of removal
! class="unsortable" | Notes
! class="unsortable" | 

 Buildings 
The following buildings were destroyed, torn down, or heavily damaged during the George Floyd protests due to their perceived racist heritage:

{| class="wikitable sortable" style="text-align:left"
! colspan="2" | Building
! City
! State
! Date of incident
! class="unsortable" | Notes
! class="unsortable" | 

See also
 Actions against memorials in Great Britain during the George Floyd protests
 Canadian Indian residential school gravesites § Reactions
 Cultural Revolution, removal of capitalist and traditional Chinese symbolism following the Chinese Communist Revolution
 Decommunization in Ukraine, a similar campaign of monument and memorial removals in Ukraine since 2014
 Denazification, removal of Nazi symbols in Germany after World War II
 Iconoclasm, the social belief in the importance of the destruction of icons and other images or monuments
 List of monument and memorial controversies in the United States
 List of public statues of individuals linked to the Atlantic slave trade
 Removal of Confederate monuments and memorials
 Rhodes Must Fall

Notes

References

Further reading
 
 
 Greenfield, Nathan M. (July 14, 2020). "Western Culture Has a Hallowed Tradition of Felling Offensive Statues". Times of San Diego. 
 Stour, James (June 15, 2020). "How to Topple a Statue Using Science". Popular Mechanics. 
 
 
 Morris, Phillip. (June 29, 2020). "As monuments fall, how does the world reckon with a racist past?". National Geographic.Kalen Goodluck. (January 6, 2021). Indigenous symbols rise as colonial monuments fall in New Mexico. National Geographic.''

External links
 
 Confederate monuments coming down amid protests
 When they came down (photograph collection)
Objection to the misrepresentation of Junípero Serra, who advocated for indigenous people

Aftermath of the George Floyd protests

May 2020 events in the United States
June 2020 events in the United States
Iconoclasm
Floyd
removed monuments and memorials
Removed Confederate States of America monuments and memorials